Football ground may refer to:

 A football stadium, a building or venue where association football matches are played and watched
 See also :Category:Association football venues
 A football pitch, the field of play